The 1998 Polish Speedway season was the 1998 season of motorcycle speedway in Poland.

Individual

Polish Individual Speedway Championship
The 1998 Individual Speedway Polish Championship final was held on 15 August at Bydgoszcz.

Golden Helmet
The 1998 Golden Golden Helmet organised by the Polish Motor Union (PZM) was the 1998 event for the league's leading riders. The final was held at Wrocław on the 25 September.

Junior Championship
 winner - Robert Dados

Silver Helmet
 winner - Rafał Okoniewski

Bronze Helmet
 winner - Rafał Okoniewski

Pairs

Polish Pairs Speedway Championship
The 1998 Polish Pairs Speedway Championship was the 1998 edition of the Polish Pairs Speedway Championship. The final was held on 11 July at Gorzów Wielkopolski.

Team

Team Speedway Polish Championship
The 1998 Team Speedway Polish Championship was the 1998 edition of the Team Polish Championship. Polonia Bydgoszcz won the gold medal for the second successive season. The team included the Gollob brothers, Piotr Protasiewicz Andy Smith and Henrik Gustafsson.

First Division

Play offs

Second Division

References

Poland Individual
Poland Team
Speedway
1998 in Polish speedway